Ingeborga Dapkūnaitė (born 20 January 1963) is а Lithuanian theatre and cinema actress, who appears mostly in Russian films. She is a winner of the Nika Award in 1994 for Best Actress.

Early life
Dapkūnaitė was born in Vilnius, Lithuania.  Her father was a diplomat and her mother was a meteorologist. For many years her parents worked in Moscow, and she saw them only on holidays. She was cared for by her grandparents and an uncle and aunt, musicians in a theatre orchestra, during her parents' long absences.

At the age of four, she first appeared on the stage in the Puccini opera Madam Butterfly, watched by her grandmother, the administrator of the Vilnius opera theatre. After her opera debut, she at first seemed to have little interest in the dramatic arts, dance, singing, or music.  For her childhood and youth, it seemed she might pursue a career in sports; she figure-skated and played basketball, popular in Lithuania. She graduated from the Lithuanian Academy of Music and Theatre under Jonas Vaitkus in 1985 and joined the Kaunas State Drama Theatre.

Career
She has had a number of minor roles in some top Hollywood movies including Mission: Impossible (1996) and Seven Years in Tibet (1997), the latter of which featured her as the wife of Heinrich Harrer (played by Brad Pitt). She is best known for her portrayal of Maroussia, the wife of Colonel Sergei Kotov (portrayed by Nikita Mikhalkov) in Mikhalkov's Academy Award-winning film Burnt by the Sun (1994). In 2001 she was a member of the jury at the 23rd Moscow International Film Festival.

She also portrayed the Russian Tsaritsa Imperatritsa Aleksandra Fyodorovna Romanova in the 2003 British mini-series The Lost Prince, and was mother to Thomas Harris's fictional cannibal and serial killer, also known to be of Lithuanian origin, Hannibal Lecter, in Hannibal Rising (2007).

On television, she plays the role of top Russian diplomat Irina Sidorova in the Norwegian hit show Okkupert (Occupied), broadcast in the US by Netflix. She was featured as a skating partner to Alexander Zhulin in Ice Age. In the first season of the BBC series Bodies, she played nurse Katya Bredova. In addition, she portrays a Bosnian refugee named Jasmina Blekic in Prime Suspect 6, co-starring Helen Mirren and in 2012 played Kenneth Branagh's love interest in the Wallander TV episode "Dogs of Riga". She also starred in Branded. She also portrayed the role of Mrs Hudson in Russia's Sherlock Holmes.

Personal life
Dapkūnaitė has been married three times. Her first husband was Lithuanian actor Arūnas Sakalauskas, her groupmate at the Vilnius Conservatory. Her second husband was British director Simon Stokes, whom she divorced in 2009. Her third husband was Russian lawyer and businessman Dmitry Yampolsky. They divorced in 2017.

In 2022 Dapkūnaitė voiced her opposition to the Russian invasion of Ukraine and left Russia.

Filmography

References

External links

1963 births
Living people
Actresses from Vilnius
Soviet film actresses
Soviet television actresses
Lithuanian film actresses
Lithuanian television actresses
Lithuanian stage actresses
20th-century Lithuanian actresses
21st-century Lithuanian actresses
Lithuanian Academy of Music and Theatre alumni
Lithuanian expatriates in Russia
Russian film actresses
Russian television actresses
Russian television presenters
Recipients of the Nika Award
Academicians of the Russian Academy of Cinema Arts and Sciences "Nika"
Russian women television presenters
Lithuanian women television presenters
Russian activists against the 2022 Russian invasion of Ukraine